The hippocampus or hippocamp, also hippokampos (plural: hippocampi or hippocamps; , from , "horse" and , "sea monster"), often called a sea-horse in English, is a mythological creature shared by Phoenician, Etruscan, Pictish, Roman and Greek mythology, though its name has a Greek origin. The hippocampus has typically been depicted as having the upper body of a horse with the lower body of a fish.

Mythology

Coins minted at Tyre around the 4th century BC show the patron god Melqart riding on a winged hippocampus and accompanied by dolphins. Coins of the same period from Byblos show a hippocampus diving under a galley.

A gold sea-horse was discovered in a hoard from the kingdom  of Lydia in Asia minor, dating to the 6th century BC.

Greek and Roman

In the Iliad, Homer describes Poseidon, god of horses, earthquakes, and the sea, driving a chariot drawn by brazen-hoofed horses over the sea's surface, and Apollonius of Rhodes, describes the horse of Poseidon emerging from the sea and galloping across the Libyan sands. This compares to the specifically "two-hoofed" hippocampi of Gaius Valerius Flaccus in his Argonautica: "Orion when grasping his father’s reins heaves the sea with the snorting of his two-hooved horses." In Hellenistic and Roman imagery, however, Poseidon (or Roman Neptune) often drives a sea-chariot drawn by hippocampi. Thus, hippocampi sport with this god in both ancient depictions and much more modern ones, such as in the waters of the 18th-century Trevi Fountain in Rome surveyed by Neptune from his niche above.

The appearance of hippocampi in both freshwater and saltwater is counter-intuitive to a modern audience, though not to an ancient one. The Greek picture of the natural hydrological cycle did not take into account the condensation of atmospheric water as rain to replenish the water table, but imagined the waters of the sea oozing back landwards through vast caverns and aquifers, rising replenished and freshened in springs.

Thus, it was natural for a temple at Helike in the coastal plain of Achaea to be dedicated to Poseidon Helikonios, (the Poseidon of Helicon), the sacred spring of Boeotian Helikon. When an earthquake suddenly submerged the city, the temple's bronze Poseidon accompanied by hippocampi continued to snag fishermens' nets.
Likewise, the hippocampus was considered an appropriate decoration for mosaics in Roman thermae or public baths, as at Aquae Sulis modern day Bath in Britannia.

Poseidon's horses, which were included in the elaborate sculptural program of gilt-bronze and ivory, added by a Roman client to the temple of Poseidon at Corinth, are likely to have been hippocampi; the Romanised Greek Pausanias described the rich ensemble in the later 2nd century AD (Geography of Greece ii.1.7-.8):

Etruscan
Hippocampi appear with the first Oriental-phase of Etruscan civilization: they remain a theme in Etruscan tomb wall-paintings and reliefs,  where they are sometimes provided with wings, as they are in the Trevi fountain. Katharine Shepard found in the theme an Etruscan belief in a sea-voyage to the other world.

Pictish
The sea-horse also appears in Pictish stone carvings in Scotland.  The symbolism of the carving (also known as "Pictish Beast" or "Kelpie") is unknown. Although similar  but not identical to Roman sea-horse images, it is unclear whether this depiction originates from images brought over by the Romans, or had a place in earlier Pictish mythology.

Medieval, Renaissance, and modern

The mythic hippocampus has been used as a heraldic charge, particularly since the Renaissance, most often in the armorial bearings of people and places with maritime associations.  However, in a blazon, the terms hippocamp and hippocampus now refer to the real animal called a seahorse, and the terms seahorse and sea-horse refer to the mythological creature.  The above-mentioned fish hybrids are seen less frequently. In appearance, the heraldic sea-horse is depicted as having the head and neck of a horse, the tail of a fish and webbed paws replacing its front hooves. Its mane may be that of a horse or it may be replaced with an additional fin. Sea-horses may be depicted with wings, and winged sea-horses with a horn were part of the armorial bearings granted to Sir Sean Connery in 2018 by the Lord Lyon King of Arms, the head of Scotland's heraldic authority.

The sea-horse is also a common image in Renaissance and Baroque art, for example, in the Trevi fountain, dating to 1732.

A winged hippocampus has been used as a symbol for Air France since its establishment in 1933 (inherited from its predecessor Air Orient); it appears today on the engine nacelles of Air France sea craft

Bronze hippocampi appear in Dublin, Leinster, Ireland on lampposts next to a statue of Henry Grattan and on Grattan Bridge.

The English football club Newcastle United has two hippocampi depicted on its crest. They appear to the left and right of the shield in the middle.

Capricornus and related mythical animals
Closely related to the hippocampus is the "sea goat", represented by Capricorn, a mythical creature with the front half of a goat and the rear half of a fish. Canonical figures, most of which were not themselves cult images, and coins of the Carian goddess associated with Aphrodite as the Aphrodite of Aphrodisias through interpretatio graeca, show the goddess riding on a sea-goat.  Brody describes her thus:

Aside from aigikampoi, the fish-tailed goats representing Capricorn, other fish-tailed animals rarely appeared in Greek art, but are more characteristic of the Etruscans. These include leokampoi (fish-tailed lions), taurokampoi (fish-tailed bulls) or pardalokampoi (fish-tailed leopards).

Astronomy

In 2019, a small moon of Neptune was named Hippocamp, after the creature.

See also
 List of fictional horses
 List of hybrid creatures in mythology
 Capricorn (astrology)
 Sea goat
 Catoblepas
 Kelpie
 Unicorn
 Water horse
 Sea horse

References

Notes

Sources
Classical references: Homer, Iliad xlii. 24, 29; Euripides,  Andromache 1012; Virgil Georgics iv. 389; Philostratus Imagines i. 8; Statius Thebaid ii. 45 and Achilleid 1.25.

External links

Theoi Project - Hippokampoi
A gold fibula, part of the "Lydian treasures" found in the former Lydian kingdom, made in the second half of the 6th century BC.

Greek legendary creatures
Horses in mythology
Mythological hybrids
Maritime folklore
Heraldic beasts